Area 29 can refer to:

 Area 29 (Nevada National Security Site)
 Brodmann area 29